Copa Rio may refer to:
 Copa Rio (international tournament), an international football tournament held in Brazil in the 1950s
 Copa Rio (state cup), a football tournament in which Rio de Janeiro's state teams take part
 Taça Rio, a Rio de Janeiro football tournament, the second stage of the state's championship